Ottavio Viviani (c. 1579-c. 1641) was an Italian painter of the Baroque period.

Viviani was born in Brescia. He was initially a pupil of Tommaso Sandrino. He painted for the royal palace of Monaco and in the Ducal palace of Sassuolo. He specialized in quadratura.

References

16th-century Italian painters
Italian male painters
17th-century Italian painters
Painters from Brescia
Italian Baroque painters
Quadratura painters
Year of birth uncertain
Year of death unknown